Guyim may refer to:
 Guyim, Mamasani
 Guyim, Shiraz